The men's mass start competition in speed skating  at the 2022 Winter Olympics was held on 19 February 2022, at the National Speed Skating Oval ("Ice Ribbon") in Beijing. Bart Swings of Belgium, the 2018 silver medalist, won the event. This was the first gold medal for Belgium at the Winter Olympics since 1948. Chung Jae-won of South Korea won the silver medal, his first individual Olympic medal, and  Lee Seung-hoon, the defending champion, bronze.

The 2018 bronze medalist, Koen Verweij, did not qualify. Joey Mantia is the 2021 World Single Distances champion in mass start, with Arjan Stroetinga and Swings being the silver and bronze medalists, respectively. Swings was leading the 2021–22 ISU Speed Skating World Cup at long distances with three events completed before the Olympics, followed by Ruslan Zakharov and Andrea Giovannini.

Qualification

A total of 24 entry quotas were available for the event, with a maximum of two athletes per NOC. All 24 athletes qualified through their performance at the 2021–22 ISU Speed Skating World Cup.

The qualification time for the event (1:57.50 (1500 m)) was released on July 1, 2021, and was unchanged from 2018. Skaters had the time period of July 1, 2021 – January 16, 2022 to achieve qualification times at valid International Skating Union (ISU) events.

Results

Semifinals

Final
Lee and Mantia were separated by a photo-finish, clocking an identical time.

References

Men's speed skating at the 2022 Winter Olympics